The LG Gx is an Android smartphone developed by LG Electronics. It serves as an update to LG's phablet, the 2012 LG Optimus G Pro, by updating the software and design to that of LG's new flagship, the 2013 LG G2. Other than that, the smartphone is exactly the same as the LG Optimus G Pro with features that include LTE connectivity and an IR blaster, which allows use as a TV remote control. The handset has only been released in Korea on LG's own network, LG U+, as of 20 February 2014 and LG has not commented on whether it will become an international device.

See also
 List of Android devices

References

External links 
Official website (Korean)

Android (operating system) devices
Gx
Mobile phones introduced in 2014
Phablets
Discontinued smartphones
Mobile phones with infrared transmitter